Tomáš Chorý (born 26 January 1995) is a Czech professional footballer who currently plays as a forward for Viktoria Plzeň.

References

External links
 
 
 
 Tomáš Chorý official international statistics
 

Czech footballers
1995 births
Sportspeople from Olomouc
Living people
Association football forwards
Czech First League players
SK Sigma Olomouc players
FC Viktoria Plzeň players
Belgian Pro League players
S.V. Zulte Waregem players
Czech expatriate footballers
Expatriate footballers in Belgium
Czech Republic youth international footballers
Czech Republic under-21 international footballers
Czech expatriate sportspeople in Belgium